Śrem Transmitter (RTCN Śrem) Is a 290 metre tall guyed steel mast, built in 1964 for the broadcasting of signal radio and television signals. It was built as a weighed 220 tonne mast by Mostostal Zabrze. The official opening was on 21 July 1964. The mast is situated in the village "Góra", in Śrem County, Poland. Due to its advantageous location, height and signal strength, its signal covers a considerably large part of the Greater Poland Voivodeship.

Transmitted Programmes

FM Radio

Digital Television MPEG-4

See also
 List of masts

External links
 http://emi.emitel.pl/EMITEL/obiekty.aspx?obiekt=DODR_W1B
 http://radiopolska.pl/wykaz/pokaz_lokalizacja.php?pid=125
 http://www.przelaczenie.eu/mapy/wielkopolskie
 http://www.dvbtmap.eu/mapcoverage.html?chid=3280

Radio masts and towers in Poland
Śrem County
Towers completed in 1964
1964 establishments in Poland